Tiger's Milk is a nutrition bar created and introduced in the 1960s by Plus Products owned by James and Arthur Ingoldsby.  It was later acquired by Weider Nutrition in the 1980s.  The brand is currently owned by McCormick & Company.

In 2007, Tiger's Milk was named by the editors of American Way magazine as one of six "Most Edible" energy bars (of 30 taste-tested).

References

Brand name snack foods
Energy food products
Dietary supplements